In chemistry, hexol is a cation with formula {[Co(NH3)4(OH)2]3Co}6+ — a coordination complex consisting of four cobalt cations in oxidation state +3, twelve ammonia molecules , and six hydroxy anions , with a net charge of +6.  The hydroxy groups act as bridges between the central cobalt atom and the other three, which carry the ammonia ligands. 

Salts of hexol, such as the sulfate {[Co(NH3)4(OH)2]3Co}(SO4)3(H2O)x, are of historical significance as the first synthetic non-carbon-containing chiral compounds.

Preparation
Salts of hexol were first described by Jørgensen, although it was Werner who recognized its structure.  The cation is prepared by heating a solution containing the cis-diaquotetramminecobalt(III) cation [Co(NH3)4(H2O)2]3+ with a dilute base:

4  [Co(NH3)4(H2O)2]3+ + 2 HO− → {[Co(NH3)4(OH)2]3Co}6+  +  4 NH4+ + 4 H2O

Hexol sulfate

Starting with the sulfate and using ammonium hydroxide as the base, depending on the conditions, one obtains the 9-hydrate, the 6-hydrate, or the 4-hydrate of hexol sulfate. These salts form dark brownish-violet or black tabular crystals, with low solubility in water.  When treated with concentrated hydrochloric acid, hexol sulfate converts to cis-diaquotetramminecobalt(III) sulfate. In boiling dilute sulfuric acid, hexol sulfate further degrades with evolution of oxygen and nitrogen.

Optical properties
The hexol cation exists as two optical isomers that are mirror images of each other, depending on the arrangement of the bonds between the central cobalt atom and the three bidentate peripheral units [Co(NH3)4(HO)2]. It belongs to the D point group.  The nature of chirality can be compared to that of the ferrioxalate anion .

In a historic set of experiments, a salt of hexol with an optically active anion — specifically, its D-(+)-bromocamphorsulfonate – was resolved into separate salts of the two cation isomers by fractional crystallisation.  A more efficient resolution involves the bis(tartrato)diantimonate(III) anion.  The hexol hexacation has a high specific rotation of 2640°.

"Second hexol"
Werner also described a second achiral hexol (a minor byproduct from the production of Fremy's salt) that he incorrectly identified as a linear tetramer. The second hexol is hexanuclear (contains six cobalt centres in each ion), not tetranuclear.

References

External links 
 Hexol Molecule of the Month September 1997 Website
 National Pollutant Inventory – Cobalt fact sheet

Cobalt compounds
Stereochemistry
Coordination complexes